{{Infobox television
| image                =
| caption              = 
| camera               = Multi-camera
| runtime              = 42 minutes
| creator              = Fernando GaitanJose Luis Duran
| developer            = TV Azteca
| producer             = Elisa SalinasJuan David Burns
| executive_producer   = Rafael GutierrezFides Velasco
| director             = Rafael GutierrezMartin BarrazaJulio Fons
| editor               = 
| starring             = Silvia NavarroSergio Basañez
| narrated             = 
| theme_music_composer = 
| opentheme            = "Cuando Seas Mia"  by Son by Four "Entra En Mi Vida" & "Kilometros" by Sin Bandera
| endtheme             = "Quisiera" by Juan Luis Guerra
| country              = Mexico
| language             = ESPAÑOL
| network              = Azteca 13
| location             = Mexico CIUDAD
| picture_format       = 
| first_aired          = 
| last_aired           = 
| related              = 
| num_episodes         = 238
| list_episodes        = 
| preceded_by          = Tío Alberto
| followed_by          = Por tí 
}}Cuando Seas Mía (English: When You Will Be Mine) is a Mexican telenovela produced by TV Azteca. It is a remake of the 1994 Colombian telenovela Café, con aroma de mujer, and the second reunion for Silvia Navarro and Sergio Basañez as protagonists.

Cast
Main cast
Silvia Navarro	... 	Teresa Suárez "The Paloma" / Elena Olivares Maldonado de Sánchez Serrano/ Margot 
Sergio Basañez	... 	Diego Sánchez Serrano Cortés 
Martha Cristiana ... "Berenice Sandoval Portocarrero De Sánchez Serrano "

Primary actors
Margarita Gralia	... 	Angela Vallejo de Sánchez Serrano. ''Villain. In the end stays alone''
Sergio de Bustamante	...  Juan Francisco Sánchez Serrano
Evangelina Elizondo	...  Inés Viuda de Sánchez Serrano 
Luis Felipe Tovar     ...  Miguel Alfonso Tejeiros y Caballero. ''Villain. Shot to death by the police''
Anette Michel ... Bárbara Castrejón de Sánchez Serrano. ''Villain. In love with Fabian. Goes to jail''
Rodrigo Abed ...  Fabián Sánchez Serrano. ''Main Villain. Killed by Diego in self-defense''
Laura Padilla	... 	Soledad Suarez
Rodrigo Cachero ...  Mariano Sanz

Protagonists
Iliana Fox ...  Diana Sánchez- Serrano Cortés de Tejeiros  
Adrián Makala....Harold McKlane  
Ana Serradilla ...  Daniela Sánchez- Serrano Cortés de McKlane  
Alejandro Lukini ...  Jeremy MacGregor  
Ramiro Huerta ...  Aurelio Durán
Juan Pablo Medina ... Bernardo Sánchez Serrano  
Enrique Becker ... Jorge Latorre  
Gloria Peralta ... Marcia Fontalvo  
Fernando Sarfatti ... Giancarlo Mondriani  
Homero Wimer ... Roberto Avellaneda

Special participations
Leonardo Daniel ...  Joaquín Sánchez Serrano  
Daniela Schmidt ...  Antonia Ruis 
Claudia Soberón ...  Lucero 
Jose Gonzalez Marquez ...  Lorenzo Sánchez Serrano 
Tania Arredondo ...  Leonor 
Claudine Sosa ...  Josefina 
Maribel Rodriguez ...  Graciela
Jesus Estrada ...  Juancho Mejia 
Adriana Parra ...  Ximena de Fontalvo 
Carolina Carvajal ...  Matilde Arango. ''Villain. Crazy. Killed her uncle Manuel and Josefina. In love with Jeremy. Wanted to kill Diana''
Alejandro Ciangherotti ...  Ricardo Sandoval. 
Carmen Delgado ...  Constanza de Sandoval 
Gabriela Andrade ...  Margarita 
Renata del Castillo ...  Martha

Secondary casts

Special guest stars

Guest stars in pilot episode 
Margarita Sanz

Tertiary casts

 International broadcasts 

Soundtrack

Cuando Seas Mía
Performed by:  Son by FourWritten by: Diane Warren "Miss Me So Bad"
Spanish version: Omar Alfanno Yoel HenriquezEpic/Sony MusicOpening theme from episode 1  to 70

Entra En Mi Vida
Performed by: Sin BanderaWritten by: Leonel Garcia  Noel SchajrisSony MusicOpening theme from episode 71 to 

Kilometros
Performed by: Sin BanderaWritten by: Leonel Garcia  Noel SchajrisSony MusicOpening theme from episode 71 to 

Quisiera
Performed by:Juan Luis Guerra440
Written by:Juan Luis GuerraKaren PublishingEnding theme for episode 1  to 70

Burbujas de Amor, La Billirubina, Como abeja al panal
Performed by:Juan Luis Guerra440
Written by:Juan Luis GuerraKaren PublishingPaloma Negra, Cucurrucucú paloma 
Performed by:Lola BeltránWritten by:Tomás MéndezEMMI PHAM'''

Song listing
01. Son by four - Cuando seas mia
02. Juan Luis Guerra - Quisiera
03. Juan Luis Guerra - Burbujas de Amor
04. Lola Beltran - Paloma negra
05. Lola Beltran - Cucurrucucu Paloma
06. Sergio Basanez - Como quien pierde una estrella
07. Sin bandera - Entra en mi vida
08. Son by four - Miss me so bad
09. Luis Fonsi - Imaginame sin ti
10. Pedro Guerra - Cerca del amor
11. Miguel Aceves Mejias - Por un amor
12. Alejandro Fernandez - Como quien pierde una estrella
13. Los Panchos - Perfidia
14. Son by four - A puro dolor (Balada)
15. Juan Luis Guerra - Quisiera (salsa)
16. Son by four - Cuando seas mia (salsa)
17. Sergio Basanez - Perfidia
18. Sin Bandera - Kilometros
19. Pedro Infante - Con un Polvo y Otro Polvo

References

2001 telenovelas
2001 Mexican television series debuts
2002 Mexican television series endings
Mexican telenovelas
TV Azteca telenovelas
Mexican television series based on Colombian television series
Spanish-language telenovelas